The 1974 Dallas Cowboys season was their 15th in the league, all under head coach Tom Landry. The Cowboys failed to improve on their previous output of 10–4, winning only eight games. They missed the playoffs for the first time in nine years, the only time in eighteen seasons (1966–1983) that the Cowboys did not advance to the postseason.

The Cowboys began with a 1–4 start and although they went 7–2 afterwards, it was not enough to overcome the slow start.

The  season featured one of the most memorable Thanksgiving games in Cowboys history.  Trailing 16–3 in the second half (and having already lost quarterback Roger Staubach to injury), little used backup Clint Longley threw two touchdown passes to lead the team to a 24–23 victory over the Redskins at Texas Stadium.

This was also a season of transition; as it was the final season of Hall of Fame defensive tackle Bob Lilly. Also finishing their careers were fullback Walt Garrison and center Dave Manders. Also, it was the final season in Dallas for wide receiver Bob Hayes (who finished his career with the San Francisco 49ers the following year), running back Calvin Hill (who departed for the Hawaiians of the World Football League), defensive end Pat Toomay (who left for the Buffalo Bills), guard John Niland (who left the following year for the Philadelphia Eagles), and quarterback Craig Morton (traded early in the season to the New York Giants).

Offseason

Draft

Schedule

Division opponents are in bold text

Game summaries

Week 3 vs Giants

Week 6 vs Eagles

Week 12 vs Redskins

Thanksgiving Day

Roger Staubach was knocked out of the game.

Standings

Roster

Publications
 The Football Encyclopedia 
 Total Football 
 Cowboys Have Always Been My Heroes

References

External links
 1974 Dallas Cowboys
 Pro Football Hall of Fame
 Dallas Cowboys Official Site

Dallas Cowboys seasons
Dallas Cowboys
Dallas Cowboys